Mark McGreal (born 1986) is an international lawn and indoor bowler from the Isle of Man.

Bowls career
In 2018, McGreal represented the Isle of Man at the 2018 Commonwealth Games in the Lawn bowls tournament held on the Gold Coast in Australia.

In 2022, he won his fourth Isle of Man National indoor singles title, which qualified him to represent the Isle of Man at the 2022 World Bowls Indoor Championships. The event had been cancelled in 2020 and 2021 due to the COVID-19 pandemic.

References

1986 births
Living people